American singer Brandy Norwood has recorded songs for her seven studio albums and has collaborated with other artists for duets and featured songs on their respective albums and charity singles. After signing a record contract with Atlantic in 1993, Norwood began to work with producers Keith Crouch and R&B group Somethin' for the People, who co-wrote and co-produced most of the songs on her 1994 debut album, Brandy. Musician Robin Thicke co-wrote the ballad "Love Is on My Side", while actor and singer Rahsaan Patterson co-wrote the album's second singles "Baby". Rodney "Darkchild" Jerkins and his team co-wrote and co-produced 10 songs out of 16 on Norwood's second album Never Say Never (1998). The album's lead single "The Boy Is Mine" was written by Norwood, Jerkins, LaShawn Daniels, Fred Jerkins III, and Joana Tejeda, while second single "Have You Ever?" was co-penned by Award-winning songwriter Diane Warren.

Norwood reteamed with Jerkins to work on her third studio album Full Moon (2002), for which he again co-wrote and co-produced 10 songs for the standard version, including lead single "What About Us?". Different writers and producers, including Warryn Campbell, Uncle Freddie, Big Bert, and Mike City significantly contributed to the album, the latter of which wrote and produced the album's title track. Norwood's fourth album Afrodisiac (2004) marked a departure from her previous work with Jerkins, who gained no credit on the album due to a disagreement on Norwood's decision to work with Timbaland and his protégé, Walter Millsap III, on the majority of the production of the album. Timbaland composed eleven tracks for the album, including singles "Afrodisiac", "Who Is She 2 U", and buzz single Turn It Up", while rapper Kanye West and Harold Lilly co-wrote the album's lead single "Talk About Our Love". It contains a sample of Mandrill's 1978 song "Gilly Hines", written by band members Claude Cave II, and Carlos, Louis and Ricardo Wilson, who were credited as a co-writer on the track.

Norwood's fifth studio album Human, her first album on Epic Records, saw the singer returning to Jerkins, who co-wrote and produced eight songs on it, including both singles "Right Here (Departed)" and "Long Distance", the latter of which was co-written by fellow singer-songwriter Bruno Mars. Other contributors included Canadian musician Esthero, British singer Natasha Bedingfield, and American singer-songwriter Frank Ocean. Two Eleven, Norwood's sixth studio album and first release on RCA Records, presented a new creative direction for the singer as she decided to include a diverse roster of collaborators. Sean Garrett, Chris Brown, Rico Love, and Bangladesh produced tracks for the album, as well as Mike WiLL Made It, and Mario Winans.

Released songs

As a main artist

As a guest artist

Unreleased songs
Many of the singer's unreleased songs have been registered – the majority by her publishing company Bran Bran Music – with professional bodies such as the United States Copyright Office, the Songwriters Hall of Fame, Broadcast Music Incorporated (BMI), American Society of Composers, Authors and Publishers (ASCAP), the Canadian Musical Reproduction Rights Agency (CMRRA) and EMI Music Publishing. Many officially unreleased Brandy songs have been scheduled, at one point, for release on records by the singer, including her six studio albums with her former music labels Atlantic, Epic and RCA Records: Brandy (1994), Never Say Never (1998), Full Moon (2002), Afrodisiac (2004), Human (2008), Two Eleven (2012), and B7 (2020). For varying reasons, the tracks were ultimately rejected and, as of 2016, remain either completely unreleased or have been leaked onto the internet and mixtapes without gaining an official release. The singer's unreleased material includes songs recorded by Norwood as a solo artist and demo versions of tracks which were eventually re-recorded by other artists, some featuring established artists such as Rihanna, Ne-Yo, Sean Paul, Jennifer Lopez and Timbaland.

References

External links
ForeverBrandy.com — official website

Brandy